The Man Who Stayed at Home is a 1919 American silent adventure drama film directed by Herbert Blaché and starring King Baggot, Claire Whitney. It was based on the play The Man Who Stayed at Home by J. E. Harold Terry and Lechmere Worrall.

Plot
Set in Virginia 1918, German spies passing information on American coastal defences are thwarted by Christopher Brent (Baggot) who is working for the secret service.

Cast
 King Baggot as Christopher Brent
 Claire Whitney as Molly Preston
 Robert Whittier as Fritz
 A.J. Herbert as Norman Preston
 Lila Leslie as Miriam Lee
 Frank Bennett as Carl Sanderson
 Ricca Allen as Miss Myrtle
 Robert Paton Gibbs as Judge Preston
 Julia Calhoun as Fraulein Schroder
 Ida Darling as Mrs Sanderson
 A. Lloyd Pack as Gaston Letour

References

External links

Play: The Man Who Stayed at Home archive.org Retrieved 15 July 2016

1919 films
American silent feature films
Films directed by Herbert Blaché
American black-and-white films
Metro Pictures films
American adventure drama films
1910s adventure drama films
1919 drama films
1910s English-language films
1910s American films
Silent American drama films
Silent adventure drama films